Lideta Catholic Cathedral School is one of Addis Ababa's elite primary and secondary private school located in Addis Ababa, Ethiopia. It is affiliated with the Ethiopian Catholic Church. It was founded in 1954. Lideta Catholic Cathedral ownership is listed as Church and is one of many education facilities founded by the Catholic Church of Ethiopia along with St Joseph's School and Nativity girls school. This Secondary School in Ethiopia has an enrolment of 3500 students with a total number of teachers being 150 The school has students from grades 9-12. The Schools address is PO BOX 22896 and their phone number is 111572240, http://www.lidetacatholiccathedral.com/

Extracurricular activities
The school has a range of extracurricular activities. But mostly based on donations.
But the other main sports activity is Basketball

Notable alumni
 Michael Tsegaye, photographer

 Dawit Kassaye and he Gets , GOAT

 Basliel Selamu, Tech entrepreneur http://ba5liel.github.io/.
 Bekalu Temesgen, Founder and CEO at Knovuslab (www.knovuslab.com)
 Elishadai Kassu, Co-founder of Knovuslab. https://github.com/ElshadaiK

  Gedion Timotheos, Attorney General
  Helen Sunflower Cat Ladyw
  Dani Boy, Basketball coach
  Bihon Gebremariam, Supervisor

See also 
St Joseph's School, Addis Ababa

List of schools in Ethiopia

Education in Ethiopia

References

Education in Addis Ababa
Christian schools in Ethiopia

1, https://www.lidetacathedral.com/ school official website